Michel Benita (born 1954 in Algiers, Algeria) is a double bass player, prominent in jazz music since 1980's. He moved to Paris in 1981 and became one of the major discoveries in European jazz scene. He has worked with Aldo Romano, Marc Ducret, Martial Solal, Lee Konitz, Andy Sheppard, Dino Saluzzi, Erik Truffaz and Archie Shepp. He formed the ELB trio in 1999 with Vietnamese guitar player Nguyên Lê and American drummer Peter Erskine.

Awards 
 Officer of the Order of Arts and Letters (2015)

Discography
 Preferences (Label Bleu, 1990)
 Soul (Label Bleu, 1993)
 The Woman Next Door (Label Bleu, 1998)
 ELB (ACT, 2004)
 Drastic (BHM Productions, 2006)
 Dream Flight (ACT, 2008)
 Ramblin'  (Blu Jazz, 2008)
 Un Soir au Club (Le Chant du Monde, 2010)
 Ethics (Zig Zag, 2010)
 Trio Libero (ECM, 2012)
 River Silver (ECM, 2016)

With Andy Sheppard

 Trio Libero (ECM, 2012)
 Surrounded by Sea (ECM, 2015)
 Romaria (ECM, 2018)

References

External links
Official site

1954 births
Living people
People from Algiers
21st-century double-bassists
Jazz double-bassists
Officiers of the Ordre des Arts et des Lettres
Orchestre National de Jazz members
Label Bleu artists
ECM Records artists
ACT Music artists